Giordano may refer to:

People
Giordano (name)
Giordano (footballer) (born 1993), Brazilian footballer
Umberto Giordano, or simply Giordano, Italian composer

Businesses
Giordano International, a Hong Kong-based, global clothing retailer
Giordano's, a retailer and innovator of Chicago-style pizza

See also
Giordano Bruno (disambiguation)

Jordan (disambiguation)
Jordanus